Penn Valley Union Elementary School District is a public school district based in Nevada County, California, United States.

References

External links
 

School districts in Nevada County, California